Preci is a comune (municipality) in the Province of Perugia in the Italian region Umbria, located about 60 km southeast of Perugia.

It is a medieval burg (13th century) developed inside a fortress, which was almost entirely destroyed by an earthquake in 1328.

Preci borders the following municipalities: Castelsantangelo sul Nera, Cerreto di Spoleto, Norcia, Visso.

The old centre of Preci was badly damaged  in the October 2016 Central Italy Earthquakes.

As at July 2018, the old centre of Preci is entirely closed off to visitors pending reconstruction work.

Main sights
Remains of the 13th-century castle in the frazione of Acquaro
Pre-historic grotto tombs, in the frazione of Fiano d'Abeto
Church of Annunziata in Poggio di Croce. It houses a 14th-century fresco of the Annunciation by Giovanni del Biondo

References

Cities and towns in Umbria